This is a list of landmarks and historic locations, mostly related to coal mining, in the vicinity of the City of Nanaimo in the Canadian province of British Columbia.

Origins of Nanaimo - Coal
Most of these landmarks relate to the city's history as a coal-mining town. Coal was discovered in the area in 1849. Joseph William McKay took possession of the deposits for the Hudson's Bay Company (HBC) in 1852 at the direction of Governor James Douglas. The area was first known as Wintuhuysen Inlet and then Colvile Town (named for HBC Governor Andrew Colvile) but became known as Nanaimo in 1860. The first church opened in 1861. In 1853 the population was 125. By 1869 it was about 650 and by 1874 it was close to 1,000.

By 1859, 25,000 tons of coal had been shipped from Nanaimo, mostly to San Francisco. In 1862 the HBC sold its coal interests to an English Company known as the Vancouver Coal Mining and Land Company (VCML). Output was 100 tons a day by 1863 and double that by 1866. By 1874, annual production was 80,000 tons and it was 10 times that by 1884. The mines in Wellington were owned by Robert Dunsmuir. Initially his company was Dunsmuir, Diggle and Co., but after he bought out his partners he carried on as R. Dunsmuir and Sons. The family company was sold by son James Dunsmuir in 1910 to Canadian Collieries (Dunsmuir) Ltd. (CCD). The VCML mines were mainly under Nanaimo and the harbour. The East Wellington colliery was owned by R.D. Chandler of San Francisco. Peak production of the Nanaimo coal fields was 1,400,000 tons in 1922. Production declined steadily after that.  The last mine in Nanaimo closed in 1968. In the early 1980s the Wolf mountain coal mine opened up and produced coal from the Wellington seam until 1987.

Locations shown are generally for the main shaft entrance although some mines, Extension No. 8 for example, had numerous slope shaft entrances as well.

Landmarks of Nanaimo

See also
History of coal mining
Mining on Vancouver Island
List of historic places in the Nanaimo Regional District

References

External links
Nanaimo Coal Mines, Vancouver Island University

Nanaimo
History of Vancouver Island
Mines in British Columbia
Nanaimo
Mid Vancouver Island